Igor Sijsling was the defending champion but chose not to defend his title.

Luca Vanni won the title after defeating Laurynas Grigelis 6–7(5–7), 6–4, 7–6(10–8) in the final.

Seeds

Draw

Finals

Top half

Bottom half

References

Main Draw
Qualifying Draw

Trofeo Citta di Brescia - Singles